SantaCon is an annual pub crawl in which people dressed in Santa Claus costumes or as other Christmas characters parade in various cities around the world.

A December 2014 cover story in the Village Voice recounted how SantaCon had evolved from "joyful performance art" that originated in San Francisco to a "reviled bar crawl" of drunken brawling, vandalism, public urination and disorder in New York City and elsewhere, resulting in fierce community resistance and disavowals from the originators of the event.

Origins

SantaCon began in San Francisco in 1994, inspired by a Mother Jones article on the Danish activist theatre group Solvognen. In 1974, Solvognen gathered dozens of "Santas" in Copenhagen to hand out items from the shelves of a department store to customers as "presents" before they were arrested. Staged as street theater by a local prankster group, the Cacophony Society — which had grown out of the earlier Suicide Club — the aim was to make fun of Christmas and the rampant consumerism associated with the holiday. Originally called Santarchy and influenced by the Surrealist movement, Discordianism, and other subversive art currents, it was not intended to be a recurrent event.  However, the event occurred again in San Francisco in 1995 as a Cacophony Society event with 100 participants and at least two arrests.

SantaCon came to Portland in 1996 to Seattle in 1997, and to Los Angeles and New York in 1998, when a "young San Franciscan strapped on a fake white beard, donned a $12 red suit, and led 200 Santas as they went caroling up Fifth Avenue in Manhattan," to the delight of passersby. It has since evolved and spread to 44 countries around the world, with varying versions and interpretations. Events for 2013 were scheduled in 300 cities, including New York City, London, Vancouver, Belfast, and Moscow. The New York SantaCon is the largest, with an estimated 30,000 people participating in 2012. Other events were much smaller and more subdued, with 30 participating in Spokane, Washington.

The event has also been variously known as Santarchy, Santa Rampage, the Red Menace, and Santapalooza.

Venues

New York City

In New York City, by far the largest SantaCon venue, the event has been criticized for widespread drunkenness and sporadic violence. At a 2011 community board meeting in lower Manhattan, residents complained that their neighborhood had been "terrorized" by SantaCon participants. An emergency room physician tweeted in 2019 that the day is dreaded by ER physicians. Another tweeted  "All the NYC folks will understand my horror at learning that I'm working in the ER during SantaCon this weekend."

In an article on the 2011 SantaCon, Gothamist called SantaCon an "annual drunken shitshow" that "has steadily devolved from cleverly subversive to barely tolerable to 'time to lock yourself in your apartment for the day.' " The New York Daily News reported in 2017 that the event "endures an annual backlash from New Yorkers repulsed by the sight of Santas vomiting or urinating in the street in years past."

During the New York City SantaCon in 2012, participants "left a trail of trouble" through Hell's Kitchen, midtown Manhattan, the East Village, and Williamsburg. Residents complained revelers vomited and urinated in the street and fought with each other. One source of tension with residents was that most of the revelers come to the event from outside the city.

That year, The New York Times described the event as "a daylong bar crawl that begins with good cheer and, for many, inevitably ends in a blurry, booze-soaked haze."

Drunken behavior in 2013 disrupted parts of Manhattan and Brooklyn, and led to calls for the event to be ended and for participant misbehavior to be curbed. The event is monitored and supported by the New York City Police Department. But community opposition has increased, as SantaCon evolved into what The Village Voice described as "a day-long spectacle of public inebriation somewhere between a low-rent Mardi Gras and a drunken fraternity party."An op-ed in The New York Times on the eve of the 2013 SantaCon criticized it for "sexism, drunkenness, xenophobia, homophobia and enough incidents of public vomiting and urination to fill an infinite dunk tank," and said it "contributes absolutely zero value – cultural, artistic, aesthetic, diversionary, culinary or political – to its host neighborhood. Quite simply, SantaCon is a parasite."
Business Insider called the 2013 event a "dreaded annual event where frat house expats" wreak havoc on the city "dressed as the jolly holiday icon." An NYPD lieutenant in Hell's Kitchen sent an open letter to local taverns in 2013 which said, "Having thousands of intoxicated partygoers roam the streets urinating, littering, vomiting and vandalizing will not be tolerated in our neighborhood." On the Lower East Side of Manhattan, residents posted notices telling SantaCon participants to stay away, saying "Alcohol Soaked Father Christmas-themed flash mob not welcome here. Take your body fluids and public intoxication elsewhere." The Los Angeles Times reported that "some see [SantaCon] as a way for people who live in the suburbs to come to the city and ruin the weekend."

Prior to the 2013 SantaCon, city authorities demanded advance notice of the route of the pub crawl. The event was diverted from the Lower East Side and Midtown Manhattan because of complaints by residents, but went through the East Village and parts of Brooklyn as originally planned. During the 2013 SantaCon in New York City, the Long Island Rail Road, Metro-North Railroad and New Jersey Transit banned alcohol consumption on their trains for 24 hours. The 2013 SantaCon was more subdued than previous ones not only due to the alcohol ban on trains, but also an increased police presence, poor weather, and advance coordination with authorities.

A SantaCon organizer said that the group was "very aware of the backlash" and has sought to curb participant misconduct by the use of "helper elves" along the SantaCon route. There were no arrests at the 2013 SantaCon in New York City, and far fewer summonses issued. A more visible police presence and poor weather were credited with the decrease. Complaints of crowds and public drunkenness continued, and "the Santas would more or less take over all of the East Village visiting bars that had no affiliation with SantaCon whatsoever, angering patrons of those establishments who had no interest in being caught up in the debauchery."
In 2014, community leaders in Bushwick, Brooklyn, banded together to block SantaCon when organizers announced their intent to move the event to that neighborhood. Rafael Espinal, Jr., the city councilman representing Bushwick, urged bars to refrain from participating in the event. A "boycott SantaCon" website was launched by other opponents, and bars said that they would refuse entry to SantaCon participants. The New York City Parks Department refused to issue a permit for use of a local park, leading organizers to cancel plans to have SantaCon in Bushwick.

After the withdrawal from Bushwick, and opposition from the community board representing the Lower East Side and Hell's Kitchen, the 2014 event was rescheduled for 13 December for 32 bars in Midtown Manhattan. Event organizers hired Norman Siegel, a civil rights attorney, to defend their rights to express themselves "within the parameters of the First Amendment." The 2014 SantaCon coincided with demonstrations in Manhattan against police brutality sparked by the Michael Brown and Eric Garner cases.

Police arrested 5 participants and handed out 100 summonses during the 2015 SantaCon, which took place on 12 December. The summonses were for offenses that included carrying an open container, disorderly conduct, and public urination. One participant was arrested for assault, one for possession of a weapon, and three with drug possession.

In anticipation of the 2016 SantaCon, scheduled for 10 December, Metro-North Railroad banned alcohol on trains and stations. The event was scheduled to take place in Midtown Manhattan, the East Village, and the Flatiron District. A hundred summonses were handed out by police but there were no arrests. The New York Daily News reported that the pub crawl left "a trail of vomit and destruction throughout the East Village" and that one bar was robbed and vandalized by SantaCon participants.

The 2017 New York City SantaCon took place on 9 December. A stepped-up police presence and 24-hour liquor ban on Long Island Rail Road trains curbed disorder. Police reported one arrest. Two arrests and over 50 summonses were reported in 2018.

The 2019 SantaCon was on 14 Dec. at bars in Times Square, Midtown, Chelsea and the East Village. The Long Island Railroad, Metro-North and New Jersey Transit banned alcohol on trains for the day. A citizens campaign was launched to ban future SantaCons in the city, and plans for "Santa party boats" were disapproved after three New York legislators raised concerns with the marina operator.

The New York City SantaCon website stated that there would be no officially sanctioned New York Santacon event in 2020 due to the COVID-19 pandemic.

Hoboken 
At the 2017 Santacon in Hoboken, New Jersey, 17 people were arrested and 55 taken to hospitals. In 2018, 14 were arrested,  including two for aggravated assault on police officers and one for a sexual offense. Hoboken's mayor, Ravi Bhalla, said that SantaCon  "remains a detriment to our city," and that Hoboken would "continue to explore ways to mitigate the impact of future ‘con’ events.”

At the Hoboken SantaCon in 2019, eight persons were arrested, 49 summonses were issued, and there were 500 calls for assistance. Twenty persons were hospitalized for alcohol-related issues. Police Chief Ken Ferrante said the event, not sanctioned by the city, cost $75,000 in extra police manpower and said that its purported charitable purpose was a "sham."

Portland 

In Portland, Oregon, the 2014 SantaCon was organized by the Cacophony Society, which had originated SantaCon in the city, and sought to recapture the event's roots. The Oregonian commented that "while the massively popular New York SantaCon made its own bold statement about First Amendment rights Saturday, the Portland SantaCon's statement went back to the charmingly subversive attitude that started it all."

San Francisco 
In 2018, SantaCon organizers said that the city of San Francisco will not sanction the event. The event went on despite the city's objections, concerned with safety and crowd control. No permits were issued and the crowd was thinner than in the past.

See also 

 Pub crawl

References

External links

 SantaCon information

Cacophony Society
Christmas in the United States
Pub crawls
Articles containing video clips
Santa Claus